Chon Chibu is a North Korean nuclear physicist who worked on the North Korean Civilian Nuclear Programme at the Yongbyon Nuclear Scientific Research Center. Chibu was photographed with Ibrahim Othman, the director general of the Syrian Atomic Energy Commission, in Syria in 2007. Documents found on Othman's laptop, including a photo of him with Chon, led to the strike at the al-Khibar nuclear reactor by the Israeli military (codenamed Operation Orchard) on 6 September 2007.

External links
Chon Chibu is featured in the following articles:
Japan Focus Journal
Financial Times
US Government
Photo of Chibu in the Economist
Italian US Embassy article
Washington Times

Living people
North Korean nuclear physicists
20th-century North Korean scientists
21st-century North Korean scientists
Year of birth missing (living people)